"God, the Omnipotent!" also known as "God, the All-terrible!" is a hymn with words written in 1842 by Henry F. Chorley (1808–1872) and 3rd and 4th stanzas by John Ellerton (1826–1893) in 1870. Set in 11.10.11.9 meter, the tune is from the 19th century Russian national anthem, God Save The Tsar!, composed by Alexei Lvov (1798–1870) in 1833.

The original form appears to be the "All-terrible", but from the early 20 century the "Omnipotent" versions seems to have become more popular.  The "All-terrible" form was retained when the [British] Methodist Hymn-Book was published in 1933.

The tune name is Russian Hymn in various modern hymnals, such as those of the United Methodist Church and the Presbyterian Church (U.S.A.), or just Russia, as in The Hymnal 1982 of the Episcopal Church in the United States of America. Called "stirring" by one hymn editor, the hymn is described as having "a triumphant, positive quality". The lyrics are as follows:

In 1982, new words to the Russian Hymn tune were composed by Carl P. Daw Jr., entitled Christ the Victorious, for the U.S. Episcopal Church's The Hymnal 1982. Both versions, God, the Omnipotent! and Christ the Victorious, appear in The Hymnal 1982.

References

External links
Words & music at the Cyber Hymnal

English Christian hymns
19th-century hymns